The men's 500 metres in short track speed skating at the 2010 Winter Olympics was held 24–26 February 2010 at the Pacific Coliseum in Vancouver, British Columbia, Canada.

The qualifying heats were held on 24 February with the quarterfinal, the semifinal and the final were held on 26 February.

Results

There were thirty-two competitors representing sixteen nations.

Heats

Quarterfinal

Semifinal

Finals

Final B (Classification Round)

Final A (Medal Round)

References

External links
 2010 Winter Olympics results: Men's 500 m (heats), from http://www.vancouver2010.com/; retrieved 2010-02-25.
 2010 Winter Olympics results: Men's 500 m (1/4 finals), from http://www.vancouver2010.com/; retrieved 2010-02-25.
 2010 Winter Olympics results: Men's 500 m (semifinals), from http://www.vancouver2010.com/; retrieved 2010-02-25.
 2010 Winter Olympics results: Men's 500 m (finals), from http://www.vancouver2010.com/; retrieved 2010-02-25.

Men's short track speed skating at the 2010 Winter Olympics